Ambriz or Ambríz is a surname. Notable people with the surname include:

 Aris Ambríz (born 1985), Mexican American professional boxer
 Carlos Ambriz (born 1994), professional Mexican footballer
 Franco Ambriz, playwright and director
 Héctor Ambriz (born 1984), American professional baseball pitcher
 Ignacio Ambríz (born 1965), Mexican former footballer
 Jaime Ambriz (born 1978), American former professional soccer player

See also
 Ambriz, a village and municipality in Bengo Province, Angola
, a steamship in service 1873-1903